The  (DOL-017) is a GameCube peripheral developed by Nintendo which enables it to play Game Boy, Game Boy Color, and Game Boy Advance cartridges, allowing those games to be played on a television.

It connects via the high speed parallel port at the bottom of the GameCube and requires use of a boot disc to access the hardware. Rather than emulating a Game Boy system, the Game Boy Player uses physical hardware nearly identical to that of a Game Boy Advance. The device does not use the enhanced effects used by the Super Game Boy (a similar peripheral for the Super Nintendo Entertainment System). The peripheral received mainly positive reviews from critics.

Design and features

The Game Boy Player is available in Indigo, Black, Spice, or Platinum in Japan; Black in North America and Europe and Black and Indigo in Australia. A special Game Boy Player for the Panasonic Q (SH-GB10-H) was released because the Q's legs are oriented differently from the original GameCube's. All Game Boy Players have screws on the bottom to secure it to the bottom of the GameCube and also have an eject button on the right side of the unit for removing Game Boy Advance games. Game Boy and Game Boy Color games stick out from the unit, as with the Game Boy Advance and Game Boy Advance SP, so they can easily be taken out when the system is off or "Change Cartridge" has been selected from the menu.

Unlike some GameCube accessories, including the Advance Game Port, Game Boy Player is not compatible with the Wii directly. The Wii lacks the hi-speed port of the GameCube into which the Game Boy Player fits; in addition, the Game Boy Player matches the GameCube's footprint. The Wii has a substantially different footprint, making direct compatibility too complicated to be included.

The Game Boy Player is region free, meaning the units will function on any GameCube system regardless of region, and like the Game Boy Advance, it will play cartridges of any region. However, the boot discs are region locked and must match the region of the GameCube system.

Controllers
The Game Boy Player allows for control either through a GameCube controller or a Game Boy Advance or Game Boy Advance SP hooked up with a GameCube-Game Boy Advance Cable. When using a Game Boy Advance, the buttons are identical, but due to the GameCube controller's different layout, there are two different mappings players can use. Also, at least one GameCube controller must be plugged in for access to the Game Boy Player's internal menu, which can be accessed by pressing the Z button.

All controllers, Game Boy Advances, and Game Boy Advance SPs connected to the GameCube are recognized as the same player. This allows a sort of co-op mode for games that do not normally have it (this was most likely not intended by Nintendo). Furthermore, allowing for multiple controllers recognized as the same player allows for simpler and more comfortable play of single system multiplayer Game Boy Advance games, such as those found in Mario Party Advance, in lieu of up to four players holding one Game Boy Advance unit.

In order to link other hardware, players are required to connect to the extension port on the Game Boy Player with the proper cable, which depends on whether the game was designed for Game Boy Advance or a Game Boy system released before the Game Boy Advance.

Map One is closer to the Game Boy Advance's normal layout, while Map Two makes it easier to play with one hand and also allows some SNES rereleases to control more like they may have with the SNES controller, as they often had the Y button mapped to L and the X button mapped to R.

Second party controllers

Japanese hardware manufacturer Hori created for the Japanese market a special digital-only controller designed for use with the Game Boy Player. The design of the controller is similar to the design of the SNES controller, but with the GameCube's face button layout. In addition, there is a Select button on the controller mapped to the Y button internally.

On-screen menu
The menu has six options to choose from:
Frame: changes the colored border around the game "screen" to one of twenty different patterns. Super Game Boy borders are not supported.
Size: changes the size that the GBA screen takes up on the TV (Normal is about 80% and appears sharper on some sets, while Full enlarges the image to the left and right edges of the TV)
Controller: switches between the two controller mappings
Screen: controls a motion blur effect to reduce potential flicker from programming tricks designed for a GBA screen. Can be set to "sharp" (no blurring), "normal" (some blurring), or "soft" (more blurring).
Timer: set an alarm for one to sixty minutes.
Change Cartridge: stops the game so cartridges can be swapped safely, without having to turn the GameCube off (it is best to save game data before doing so).

Compatibility
The Game Boy Player supports the following:

Game Boy Game Paks: Compatible with most Game Boy, Game Boy Color, and Game Boy Advance games. Game Boy games can be played using the same selectable color palettes as on the Game Boy Color, Game Boy Advance and Game Boy Advance SP. Games with compatibility issues are listed below.
e-Reader: Compatible with the e-Reader accessory, as well as all classic games, Mario Party-e, Super Mario Advance 4: Super Mario Bros. 3-e, Animal Crossing-e, and Pokémon Battle-e cards.
GameCube – Game Boy Advance link cable: By plugging it into a GameCube controller port, a GBA or GBA SP can be used as a substitute for a GameCube controller. By inserting a cable into the GBA link cable port and the GameCube controller plug into a second GameCube or a Wii, the Game Boy Player can be used to connect to a GameCube game.
Wireless Adapter: The GBP fully supports the use of a Wireless Adapter, and will work with all games compatible with the accessory.

Compatibility issues
The instruction manual for the Game Boy Player specifically mentions that "A few original Game Boy Game Paks may have display or sound problems," and that "Motion sensor [...], rumble feature and infrared feature Game Paks will not work with the Game Boy Player." The following list concerns Game Boy Advance games and accessories that have compatibility issues, be they software or physical hardware, with the Game Boy Player:

Game Boy Advance Video: All GBA Video cartridges are incompatible with the Game Boy Player. This measure was to prevent users from attaching the Game Boy Player to a VCR or DVD recorder and copying the Game Boy Video material. The GBA Video carts detect the Game Boy Player and refuse to boot when running under it, giving an error message. Even if the carts were playable on the player (which they are through the use of flash carts and Action Replay), the resolution was greatly reduced for the GBA medium, causing pixelation and sound pops that a large screen with louder speakers would pick up.
Action Replay/Gameshark: Most models of the Action Replay or Gameshark for the GBA or GBC are too wide to fit into the GBP's cartridge slot and often curl underneath the Game Boy Player system. One can overcome this problem by either modifying the device or simply through use of a ledge or propping up the system an inch. Despite these problems, most common Action Replay and Gameshark devices will work normally.
Motion sensors: Kirby Tilt 'n' Tumble for Game Boy Color; and Yoshi's Universal Gravitation, WarioWare: Twisted! and the Japan-only Koro Koro Puzzle Happy Panechu! for Game Boy Advance all use motion sensors. While the manual claims that these games are incompatible with the Game Boy Player, they are possible to play, but impractical to control properly; due to the motion-sensing being designed with a Game Boy unit in mind, it is necessary to tilt the whole GameCube unit to control them.
 There are motion sensing patches for some of the ROM images of the Game Boy Advance games to allow for use on the Game Boy Player, but this method is not possible without a flash cart.
Infrared: Due to the lack of an infrared port on the Game Boy Player, Game Boy Color games cannot make use of this feature when played on the Game Boy Player.
Boktai cartridges: While the games can be played on the Game Boy Player, it is impractical to do so due to their reliance on the light sensor.
Game Boy Camera: The Game Boy Camera is perfectly functional on the Game Boy Player. While it is impractical to take photos with it due to the camera's fixed position, its other features (looking at the album, stamping pictures, playing games, printing pictures, etc.) work normally.
Game Boy Micro: A Game Boy Micro cannot be connected to the Game Boy Player via link cable. The equipment required for a link-up is a Game Boy Micro Link Cable and a Game Boy Micro Converter Connector, along with a Game Boy Micro and Game Boy Player. The Converter Connector is built in such a way that the protruding (sticking out) piece of plastic on top prevents it from being inserted into the Game Boy Player all the way. Despite this, Nintendo previously mentioned on their website that the Converter Connector could be used to connect to the Game Boy Player. However, by separating the two pieces of plastic on the end of the Converter Connector that connects to a Game Boy Advance, a linkup between a Game Boy Micro and Game Boy Player becomes possible. The Game Boy micro can also communicate with the Game Boy Player using Wireless Adapters (the Game Boy Micro Wireless Adapter for the Game Boy micro and the Game Boy Advance Wireless Adapter for the Game Boy Player).
Games with integrated rumble for Game Boy Color: Game Boy Color games such as Pokémon Pinball may have integrated rumble. While the manual claims that these games are incompatible with the Game Boy Player, they can be played, but the rumble feature is not accessible to the player because it is only output through the Game Pak itself, not the GameCube controller. Additionally, the carts do not fit into the player as easily as most other carts.
Action Pad/Beat Pad: The two dance pad controllers for the GameCube, the GCN Action Pad (bundled with Dance Dance Revolution Mario Mix) and the Mad Catz Beat Pad (bundled with MC Groovz Dance Craze), do not properly interact with the Game Boy Color Dance Dance Revolution games due to time synchronization issues. This is likely because they were never intended to be used together.
Game Boy Color games incompatible with the Game Boy Advance: The games Pocket Music and Chee-Chai Alien are incompatible with the Game Boy Advance, and thus the Game Boy Player, giving an error message stating that they can only be played on the Game Boy Color if attempted. Chee-Chai Alien uses the infrared port of the Game Boy Color to detect light as a fundamental part of the game. Pocket Music utilizes the Game Boy Color's sound chip in ways not possible on the Game Boy Advance, so a separate version was released for the Game Boy Advance.

Rumble enabled

The Game Boy Player added a rumble feature to certain Game Boy Advance games when played with a GameCube controller. Those games included:

 Drill Dozer (also has rumble built into cartridge for mobile use)
 Mario & Luigi: Superstar Saga
 Pokémon Pinball: Ruby & Sapphire
 Shikakui Atama wo Marukusuru Advance: Kokugo Sansu Rika Shakai
 Shikakui Atama wo Marukusuru Advance: Kanji Keisan
 Summon Night Craft Sword Monogatari: Hajimari no Ishi
 Super Mario Advance 4: Super Mario Bros. 3

Reception
Reception was mainly positive — many review sites cited how Nintendo effectively increased the GameCube's library by hundreds of games with the Game Boy Player, something that some reviewers praised and others mocked as a cheap ploy.

IGN mentioned that the filtering that the Game Boy Player uses (to relieve strobe effect on games using a flicker trick to make sprites seem transparent) "muddies" some of the graphics.

Advance Game Port
Datel's version of the Game Boy Player was released in 2003. This dongle connects to Memory Card Slot B and can be booted up with the included boot disc. Later models have code generators for built in cheat devices. The advantage is that no removal of plates on the bottom, nor tools, are needed to install it. Unlike the Game Boy Player, the Advance Game Port utilizes software emulation, causing numerous audio and video issues in many games.

Up until System Menu 3.0's release, and later the dawn of Wii homebrew, this was also the only way of running Game Boy Advance games on the Wii — because, as the Wii lacks the correct port, the Game Boy Player cannot be used. Before System Menu 3.0, the Wii allowed unofficial GameCube software, such as this and Action Replay. As the dongle plugs into the Memory Card Slot, it was fully compatible with the Wii. System Menu 3.0 prevented unofficial GameCube software from running, rendering this unusable. With the dawn of Wii homebrew, it is now possible to run the Game Boy lineup of games via an emulator.

See also
 Visteon Dockable Entertainment

References

Game Boy accessories
Game Boy Advance
GameCube accessories
Games with GameCube-GBA connectivity
Discontinued video game consoles
Game console intercompatibility hardware
Intelligent Systems
Video game console add-ons